Pioneer 1 is a Soviet FIA Group VII land speed record car built in 1960 under the guidance of sportsman and engineer Ilya Aleksandrovich Tikhomirov. Derived from the Kharkov-L1, the body was aluminum and the wheels made from magnesium alloy. It was powered by two gas turbine engines ( each at 50,000 rpm) mounted either side of the driver.

The second stage of each turbine drove a planetary reduction gearbox, mated to a central driving unit pirated from the Kharkov-L1. The turbines were fitted with a water-methanol injection system.

In 1963, Tikhomirov modified Pioneer 1 even further, to create Pioneer 2M.

Notes

See also 
List of vehicle speed records

External links 
 Autosport forum (more information) 

Gas turbine land speed record cars
Soviet automobiles
Cars introduced in 1960
1960s cars